The 1926 Hong Kong Sanitary Board election was held on 12 April 1926 for replacing the retiring C. Grenville Alabaster in the Sanitary Board of Hong Kong. It was one of the few contests in the Sanitary Board elections.

Only ratepayers who were included in the Special and Common Jury Lists of the years or ratepayers who are exempted from serving on Juries on account of their professional avocations, unofficial members of the Executive or Legislative Council, or categories of profession were entitled to vote at the election.

Two nominations were received from former Board member Dr. F. M. G. Ozorio and Dr. Ho Sai-chuen. Dr. Ozorio was once the member of the Board for nine years until he resigned in 1925. He was nominated by Mr. C. A. da Roza and seconded by mr. J. M. d'Almada Remedios. Dr. Ho was nominated by Dr. S. F. Lee and seconded by Dr. Robert Kotewall.

Result

Citations

References
 Endacott, G. B. Government and people in Hong Kong, 1841-1962 : a constitutional history Hong Kong University Press. (1964) 
 The Hong Kong Government Gazette

Hong Kong
1926 in Hong Kong
Sanitary
April 1926 events
1926 elections in the British Empire